The Woman on the Index is a lost 1919 American silent drama film directed by Hobart Henley and starring Pauline Frederick and her then husband playwright Willard Mack. It was Frederick's first film at Goldwyn Pictures after coming over from Paramount. It is based on a 1918 Broadway play, The Woman on the Index, that starred Julia Dean.

Plot
As described in a film magazine, Sylvia Martin's (Frederick) past is that of despair. Turned out of an unhappy home, she becomes the wife of a handsome and manly type of crook. However, before the marriage can be consummated, he kills himself to avoid arrest. Sylvia is put on trial for murder and acquitted, but her name is recorded in a police index that falls into the hands of Hugo Declasse (Mack), an astute agent of the Bolsheviki. He pursues the wife, but she is also compelled to lend herself to the schemes of a secret service officer. She through her cleverness obtains documents held in the rooms of Declasse. In the end, she is returned to the arms of a forgiving and adoring husband.

Cast
Pauline Frederick as Sylvia Martin
Wyndham Standing as David Maber
Willard Mack as Hugo Declasse
Ben Hendricks Sr. as John Alden (*as Ben Hendricks)
Jere Austin as Louis Gordon
Louis Stern as John Martin
Francis Joyner as Butler (as Frank Joyner) 
Florence Ashbrooke as Mother Fralonz
Florida Kingsley as Mrs. Martin

References

External links

Still of a scene in the film (University of Washington, Sayre collection)

1919 films
American silent feature films
Lost American films
Films directed by Hobart Henley
Goldwyn Pictures films
American films based on plays
American black-and-white films
Silent American drama films
1919 drama films
1919 lost films
Lost drama films
1910s American films
1910s English-language films